Nikola I may refer to:

 Nikola I Gorjanski (died 1386)
 Nicholas I of Montenegro (1841–1921)

See also

 Nikola One, a model of truck from the Nikola Motor Company
 
 Nicholas I (disambiguation)
 Nikola (disambiguation)